Doris Egan (born 1955) is an American screenwriter, producer, and writer. She has worked on Smallville, Dark Angel, and House as well as many other television programs.

Partial bibliography

Gate of Ivory trilogy
 The Gate of Ivory (February 1989, DAW Books)
 Two-Bit Heroes (January 1992, DAW Books)
 Guilt-Edged Ivory (September 1992, DAW Books)

Other books
 City of Diamond (as Jane Emerson) (March 1996, DAW Books)

Short stories
"The New Tiresias" (1997, as Jane Emerson) in The Horns of Elfland (ed. Ellen Kushner, Delia Sherman, and Donald G. Keller)

Partial filmography

Writer
 The Good Doctor (2019–21)
 Swamp Thing (2019)
 Krypton (2018)
 Mars Project (2016) (TV movie)
 Black Sails (2014)
 Reign (2013–15)
 Torchwood: Miracle Day (2011)
 House (2006–2010)
 Tru Calling (2004–2005)
 Numb3rs (2005)
 Skin (2003)
 The Agency (2003)
 Smallville (2002)
 Dark Angel (2001)
 Profiler (1998–1999)
 Profiler (1998)
 Early Edition (1996)

Producer
 Swamp Thing (2019)
 Krypton (2018)
 Mars Project (2016) (TV movie)
 Black Sails (2014)
 Reign (2013-2015)
 Torchwood: Miracle Day (2011)
 House (2005–2010)
 Numb3rs (2005)
 Tru Calling (2004-2005)
 Skin (2003-2004)
 NCIS (2003)
 Smallville (2001-2002)
 The Agency (2001)
 Dark Angel (2001)

External links 
 

 Fantastic Fiction bibliography of Doris Egan's fiction
 Doris Egan's LiveJournal

1955 births
20th-century American novelists
American television producers
American women television producers
American television writers
Living people
People from New Jersey
American women television writers
American women novelists
20th-century American women writers
21st-century American women